Marine Tactical Reconnaissance Squadron 3 (VMFP-3) was an aviation unit of the United States Marine Corps active between 1975 and 1990.

Mission
Conduct aerial, multisensor imagery reconnaissance to include aerial photographic, infrared, and side looking airborne radar reconnaissance in support of Fleet Marine Force operations.

History
VMFP-3 was activated on 1 July 1975 as part of the 3rd Marine Aircraft Wing at Marine Corps Air Station El Toro, California (USA). The squadron was deactivated on 1 July 1990 ( See AlMar 24-1990).

Photo and electronic reconnaissance had previously been conducted by three Marine Composite Reconnaissance Squadrons (VMCJ-1, 2, 3) located at MCAS Iwakuni (Japan), MCAS Cherry Point, and MCAS El Toro, respectively. These squadrons, (each flying RF-4Bs and EA-6As) were consolidated into two squadrons- VMAQ-2 at MCAS Cherry Point operating all the EA-6s, and VMFP-3 operating all the RF-4Bs. Each squadron would deploy detachments to Iwakuni to fly missions previously flown by VMCJ-1.

Overseas detachments, in addition to supporting FMF operations, continued the 7th fleet support started by VMCJ-1 in 1974. RF-4Bs of VMFP-3 were permanently deployed aboard the aircraft carrier  from 1975 to 1984. A six-plane detachment operated as part of Carrier Air Wing Five, although retaining their own tail code "RF".

In 1990 Marine tactical reconnaissance was taken over by the Advanced Tactical Airborne Reconnaissance System carried by McDonnell Douglas F/A-18D Hornet aircraft of Marine fighter attack squadrons (VMFA). Consequently, all RF-4Bs were retired and VMFP-3 was disbanded.

See also

 United States Marine Corps Aviation
 List of decommissioned United States Marine Corps aircraft squadrons

References
Notes

Bibliography

Web

External links
    Photo of an RF-4B Phantom II, with VMFP-3 markings, on display at the National Museum of Naval Aviation
 Photo of an RF-4B Phantom II, with VMFP-3 markings, on display at the Flying Leatherneck Aviation Museum at MCAS Miramar
These are both dead links.

Photo
Inactive units of the United States Marine Corps
Reconnaissance units of the United States
Military units and formations disestablished in 1990